The tāmūrē, or tamouré as popularized in many 1960s recordings, is a dance from Tahiti and the Cook Islands and although denied by the local purists, for the rest of the world it is the most popular dance and the mark of Tahiti. Usually danced as a group of boys and girls, all dressed in more (the Tahitian grass skirt, however not made of grass but of the fibers from the bark of the pūrau, "hibiscus"). 

The boys shake their knees (as scissors, from there the use of the word pāoti (scissors) for this movement), and the girls shake their hips (and their long, loose hairs, if they have them). In reality the movement of their knees is the engine which drives their hips.

Their feet should stay flat on the ground and their shoulders should remain stationary. However traditionally in the Ote'a or Ura Pa'u, the hips in Tahiti are shaken round and round (in what is known as the fa'arapu) while in the Cook Islands the hips are in a side to side movement. But due to the tamure, this emphasis is less important. 

The movements of the hands is of secondary importance. The girls are largely standing still, the boys move around their partner, either facing her in front or hiding behind her back (as seen from the public). The tempo of the music is continuously increased up to the point where only the most experienced and fittest dancers can keep their shakings up. Depending on the performers, the sexual innuendo may be more or less obvious. The predecessor of the tāmūrē, the traditional upaupa was outlawed by the LMS missionaries for that reason.
Tāmūrē is a foreign word, the name of a fish in the Tuamotu, the real name of the dance is ori Tahiti (Tahitian dance). 

Shortly after the Second World War a soldier of the Pacific battalion, Louis Martin, wrote a song on a classic rhythm in which he used the word tāmūrē quite often as a tra-la-la. He afterwards was known as Tāmūrē Martin, and a new genre was born.

References

Dances of Tahiti
Cook Islands culture